Crawl is an EP by American garage rock band Laughing Hyenas, released on October 19, 1992 by Touch and Go Records.

Recording 
After original members Kevin Strickland and Jim Kimball departed from the band to form Mule, they were replaced by Kevin Ries, a fan from Cleveland, and Todd Swalla, former drummer of Necros.

Reception 

AllMusic critic Mark Deming awarded the EP 4.5 stars, although he criticized it for showing the band "in the midst of a rebuilding year" and noted that "they weren't playing badly, but it would be a little while before the new lineup was fully up to speed".

Track listing

Personnel 
Adapted from the Crawl liner notes.

Laughing Hyenas
 John Brannon – lead vocals
 Kevin Ries – bass guitar
 Larissa Strickland – guitar
 Todd Swalla – drums

Production and additional personnel
 Laughing Hyenas – production
 Al Sutton – production, engineering
 Bill Widener – cover art

Release history

References

External links 
 

1992 EPs
Laughing Hyenas albums
Touch and Go Records EPs